Deception or falsehood is an act or statement that misleads, hides the truth, or promotes a belief, concept, or idea that is not true. It is often done for personal gain or advantage. Deception can involve dissimulation, propaganda and sleight of hand as well as distraction, camouflage or concealment. There is also self-deception, as in bad faith. It can also be called, with varying subjective implications, beguilement, deceit, bluff, mystification, ruse, or subterfuge.

Deception is a major relational transgression that often leads to feelings of betrayal and distrust between relational partners. Deception violates relational rules and is considered to be a negative violation of expectations. Most people expect friends, relational partners, and even strangers to be truthful most of the time. If people expected most conversations to be untruthful, talking and communicating with others would require distraction and misdirection to acquire reliable information. A significant amount of deception occurs between some romantic and relational partners.

Deceit and dishonesty can also form grounds for civil litigation in tort, or contract law (where it is known as misrepresentation or fraudulent misrepresentation if deliberate), or give rise to criminal prosecution for fraud. It also forms a vital part of psychological warfare in denial and deception.

Types

Communication
Deception includes several types of communications or omissions that serve to distort or omit the whole truth. Examples of deception range from false statements to misleading claims in which relevant information is omitted, leading the receiver to infer false conclusions.  For example, a claim that 'sunflower oil is beneficial to brain health due to the presence of omega-3 fatty acids' may be misleading, as it leads the receiver to believe sunflower oil will benefit brain health more so than other foods.  In fact, sunflower oil is relatively low in omega-3 fatty acids and is not particularly good for brain health, so while this claim is technically true, it leads the receiver to infer false information.  Deception itself is intentionally managing verbal or nonverbal messages so that the message receiver will believe in a way that the message sender knows is false. Intent is critical with regard to deception. Intent differentiates between deception and an honest mistake. The Interpersonal Deception Theory explores the interrelation between communicative context and sender and receiver cognitions and behaviors in deceptive exchanges.

Some forms of deception include:
 Lies: making up information or giving information that is the opposite or very different from the truth.
 Equivocations: making an indirect, ambiguous, or contradictory statement.
 Concealments: omitting information that is important or relevant to the given context, or engaging in behavior that helps hide relevant information.
 Exaggerations: overstatement or stretching the truth to a degree.
 Understatements: minimization or downplaying aspects of the truth.
 Untruths: misinterpreting the truth.

Buller and Burgoon (1996) have proposed three taxonomies to distinguish motivations for deception based on their Interpersonal Deception Theory:
 Instrumental: to avoid punishment or to protect resources
 Relational: to maintain relationships or bonds
 Identity: to preserve "face" or the self-image

Appearance
Simulation consists of exhibiting false information. There are three simulation techniques: mimicry (copying another model or example, such as non-poisonous snakes which have the colours and markings of poisonous snakes), fabrication (making up a new model), and distraction (offering an alternative model)

Mimicry
In the biological world, mimicry involves unconscious deception by similarity to another organism, or to a natural object. Animals for example may deceive predators or prey by visual, auditory or other means.

Fabrication
To make something that appears to be something that it is not, usually for the purpose of encouraging an adversary to reveal, endanger, or divert that adversary's own resources (i.e., as a decoy). For example, in World War II, it was common for the Allies to use hollow tanks made out of wood to fool German reconnaissance planes into thinking a large armor unit was on the move in one area while the real tanks were well hidden and on the move in a location far from the fabricated "dummy" tanks. Mock airplanes and fake airfields have also been created.

Distraction
To get someone's attention from the truth by offering bait or something else more tempting to divert attention away from the object being concealed. For example, a security company publicly announces that it will ship a large gold shipment down one route, while in reality taking a different route. A military unit trying to maneuver out of a dangerous position may make a feint attack or fake retreat, to make the enemy think they are doing one thing while in fact they have another goal.

Camouflage

The camouflage of a physical object often works by breaking up the visual boundary of that object. This usually involves colouring the camouflaged object with the same colours as the background against which the object will be hidden. In the realm of deceptive half-truths, camouflage is realized by 'hiding' some of the truths.

Military camouflage as a form of visual deception is a part of military deception. Some Allied navies during World War II used dazzle camouflage painting schemes to confuse observers regarding a naval vessel's speed and heading, by breaking up the ship's otherwise obvious silhouette.

In nature, the defensive mechanisms of most octopuses to eject black ink in a large cloud to aid in escape from predators is a form of camouflage.

Disguise

A disguise is an appearance to create the impression of being somebody or something else; for a well-known person this is also called incognito. Passing involves more than mere dress and can include hiding one's real manner of speech. The fictional detective Sherlock Holmes often disguised himself as somebody else to avoid being recognized.

In a more abstract sense, 'disguise' may refer to the act of disguising the nature of a particular proposal in order to hide an unpopular motivation or effect associated with that proposal. This is a form of political spin or propaganda, covering the matters of rationalisation and transfer  within the techniques of propaganda generation. For example, depicting an act of war (an attack) as a "peace" mission or "spinning" a kidnapping as a protective custody.

A seventeenth-century story collection, Zhang Yingyu's The Book of Swindles (ca. 1617), offers multiple examples of the bait-and-switch and fraud techniques involving the stimulation of greed in Ming-dynasty China.

In romantic relationships 

Deception is particularly common within romantic relationships, with more than 90% of individuals admitting to lying or not being completely honest with their partner at one time.

There are three primary motivations for deception in relationships.

Deception impacts the perception of a relationship in a variety of ways, for both the deceiver and the deceived. The deceiver typically perceives less understanding and intimacy from the relationship, in that they see their partner as  less empathetic and more distant. The act of deception can also result in feelings of distress for the deceiver, which become worse the longer the deceiver has known the deceived, as well as in longer-term relationships. Once discovered, deception creates feelings of detachment and uneasiness surrounding the relationship for both partners; this can eventually lead to both partners becoming more removed from the relationship or deterioration of the relationship. In general, discovery of deception can result in a decrease in relationship satisfaction and commitment level, however, in instances where a person is successfully deceived, relationship satisfaction can actually be positively impacted for the person deceived, since lies are typically used to make the other partner feel more positive about the relationship.

In general, deception tends to occur less often in relationships with higher satisfaction and commitment levels and in relationships where partners have known each other longer, such as long-term relationships and marriage. In comparison, deception is more likely to occur in casual relationships and in dating where commitment level and length of acquaintanceship is often much lower.

Deception and infidelity 

Unique to exclusive romantic relationships is the use of deception in the form of infidelity. When it comes to the occurrence of infidelity, there are many individual difference factors that can impact this behavior. Infidelity is impacted by attachment style, relationship satisfaction, executive function, sociosexual orientation, personality traits, and gender. Attachment style impacts the probability of infidelity and research indicates that people with an insecure attachment style (anxious or avoidant) are more likely to cheat compared to individuals with a secure attachment style, especially for avoidant men and anxious women. Insecure attachment styles are characterized by a lack of comfort within a romantic relationship resulting in a desire to be overly independent (avoidant attachment style) or a desire to be overly dependent on their partner in an unhealthy way (anxious attachment style). Those with an insecure attachment style are characterized by not believing that their romantic partner can/will support and comfort them in an effective way, either stemming from a negative belief regarding themselves (anxious attachment style) or a negative belief regarding romantic others (avoidant attachment style). Women are more likely to commit infidelity when they are emotionally unsatisfied with their relationship whereas men are more likely to commit infidelity if they are sexually unsatisfied with their current relationship. Women are more likely to commit emotional infidelity than men while men are more likely to commit sexual infidelity than women; however, these are not mutually exclusive categories as both men and women can and do engage in emotional or sexual infidelity.

Executive control is a part of executive functions that allows for individuals to monitor and control their behavior through thinking about and managing their actions. The level of executive control that an individual possesses is impacted by development and experience and can be improved through training and practice. Those individuals that show a higher level of executive control can more easily influence/control their thoughts and behaviors in relation to potential threats to an ongoing relationship which can result in paying less attention to threats to the current relationship (other potential romantic mates). Sociosexual orientation is concerned with how freely individuals partake in casual sex outside of a committed relationship and their beliefs regarding how necessary it is to be in love in order to engage in sex with someone. Individuals with a less restrictive sociosexual orientation (more likely to partake in casual sex) are more likely to engage in infidelity. Individuals that have personality traits including (high) neuroticism, (low) agreeableness, and (low) conscientiousness are more likely to commit infidelity. Men are generally speculated to cheat more than women, but it is unclear if this is a result of socialization processes where it is more acceptable for men to cheat compared to women or due to an actual increase in this behavior for men. Research conducted by Conley and colleagues (2011) suggests that the reasoning behind these gender differences stems from the negative stigma associated with women who engage in casual sex and inferences about the sexual capability of the potential sexual partner. In their study, men and women were equally likely to accept a sexual proposal from an individual who was speculated to have a high level of sexual prowess. Additionally, women were just as likely as men to accept a casual sexual proposal when they did not anticipate being subjected to the negative stigma of sexually permissible women as slutty.

Online dating deceptions 

Research on the use of deception in online dating has shown that people are generally truthful about themselves with the exception of physical attributes to appear more attractive.  According to the Scientific American, "nine out of ten online daters will fib about their height, weight, or age" such that men were more likely to lie about height while women were more likely to lie about weight. In a study conducted by Toma and Hancock, "less attractive people were found to be more likely to have chosen a profile picture in which they were significantly more attractive than they were in everyday life". Both genders used this strategy in online dating profiles, but women more so than men. Additionally, less attractive people were more likely to have "lied about objective measures of physical attractiveness such as height and weight". In general, men are more likely to lie on dating profiles the one exception being that women are more likely to lie about weight.

Detection
Deception detection between relational partners is extremely difficult unless a partner tells a blatant or obvious lie or contradicts something the other partner knows to be true. While it is difficult to deceive a partner over a long period of time, deception often occurs in day-to-day conversations between relational partners. Detecting deception is difficult because there are no known completely reliable indicators of deception and because people often reply on a truth-default state. Deception, however, places a significant cognitive load on the deceiver. He or she must recall previous statements so that his or her story remains consistent and believable. As a result, deceivers often leak important information both verbally and nonverbally.

Deception and its detection is a complex, fluid, and cognitive process that is based on the context of the message exchange. The interpersonal deception theory posits that interpersonal deception is a dynamic, iterative process of mutual influence between a sender, who manipulates information to depart from the truth, and a receiver, who attempts to establish the validity of the message. A deceiver's actions are interrelated to the message receiver's actions. It is during this exchange that the deceiver will reveal verbal and nonverbal information about deceit. Some research has found that there are some cues that may be correlated with deceptive communication, but scholars frequently disagree about the effectiveness of many of these cues to serve as reliable indicators. Noted deception scholar Aldert Vrij even states that there is no nonverbal behavior that is uniquely associated with deception. As previously stated, a specific behavioral indicator of deception does not exist. There are, however, some nonverbal behaviors that have been found to be correlated with deception. Vrij found that examining a "cluster" of these cues was a significantly more reliable indicator of deception than examining a single cue.

Many people believe that they are good at deception, though this confidence is often misplaced.

Mark Frank proposes that deception is detected at the cognitive level. Lying requires deliberate conscious behavior, so listening to speech and watching body language are important factors in detecting lies.  If a response to a question has a lot disturbances, less talking time, repeated words, and poor logical structure, then the person may be lying. Vocal cues such as frequency height and variation may also provide meaningful clues to deceit.

Fear specifically causes heightened arousal in liars, which manifests in more frequent blinking, pupil dilation, speech disturbances, and a higher pitched voice. The liars that experience guilt have been shown to make attempts at putting distance between themselves and the deceptive communication, producing "nonimmediacy cues" These can be verbal or physical, including speaking in more indirect ways and showing an inability to maintain eye contact with their conversation partners. Another cue for detecting deceptive speech is the tone of the speech itself. Streeter, Krauss, Geller, Olson, and Apple (1977) have assessed that fear and anger, two emotions widely associated with deception, cause greater arousal than grief or indifference, and note that the amount of stress one feels is directly related to the frequency of the voice.

In business
People who negotiate feel more tempted to use deceit. In negotiation, it includes both parties to trust and respect one another. In negotiations, one party is unaware of what is going on in the other side of the thing that needs to be negotiated. Deception in negotiation comes in many forms, and each has its reaction (Gaspar et al.,2019).
 Price reservation: Not stating the real budget or price that you are trying to get.
 Misrepresentation of interests: Getting interests if the buyer seems desperate.
 Fabrication of facts: This is the most immoral part, where the person lies about materials, misleading information to get a sale.
 Omitting relevance: Not stating something that is helpful to know, for example, a car can be like new but it does not help if you leave out the part that there is a transmission issue.

In journalism
Journalistic deception ranges from passive activities (i.e. blending into a civil rights march) to active deception (i.e. falsely identifying oneself over the telephone, getting hired as a worker at a mental hospital).  Paul Bran says that the journalist does not stand apart from the rest of the populace in the use of deception.

In law

For legal purposes, deceit is a tort that occurs when a person makes a factual misrepresentation, knowing that it is false (or having no belief in its truth and being reckless as to whether it is true) and intending it to be relied on by the recipient, and the recipient acts to his or her detriment in reliance on it.  Deceit may also be grounds for legal action in contract law (known as misrepresentation, or if deliberate, fraudulent misrepresentation), or a criminal prosecution, on the basis of fraud.

In government 
The use of deception by a government is typically frowned upon unless it's in reference to military operations. These terms refer to the means by which governments employ deception:
 Subterfuge – in the case of disguise and disguised movement
 Secrecy – in the fortification of communications and in the fortified concealing of documents.
 Propaganda – somewhat controversial label for what governments produce in the way of controlled information and message in media documents and communications.
 Fake news – in criminal investigations, the delivery of information to the public, the deliberate transformation of certain key details.
 Misinformation – similar to the above, but unconfined to criminal investigations.
 Military secret – secrecy for military operations
 False flag – military operations that deal with deception as their main component.

In religion
Deception is a common topic in religious discussions.  Some sources focus on how religious texts deal with deception.  But, other sources focus on the deceptions created by the religions themselves.  For example, Ryan McKnight is the founder of an organization called FaithLeaks.  He stated that the organizations "goal is to reduce the amount of deception and untruths and unethical behaviors that exist in some facets of religion".

Christianity

Islam

Taqiya is an Islamic juridical term for the cases in which a Muslim is allowed, under Sharia law, to lie. The main case is to deny their faith when faced with persecution. The concept varies "significantly among Islamic sects, scholars, countries, and political regimes", and has been evoked by critics of Islam to portray the faith as dishonest.

In philosophy
Deception is a recurring theme in modern philosophy. In 1641 Descartes published his meditations, in which he introduced the notion of the Deus deceptor, a posited being capable of deceiving the thinking ego about reality. The notion was used as part of his hyperbolic doubt, wherein one decides to doubt everything there is to doubt. The Deus deceptor is a mainstay of so-called skeptical arguments, which purport to put into question our knowledge of reality. The punch of the argument is that all we know might be wrong, since we might be deceived. Stanley Cavell has argued that all skepticism has its root in this fear of deception.

In psychological research
Psychological research often needs to deceive the subjects as to its actual purpose. The rationale for such deception is that humans are sensitive to how they appear to others (and to themselves) and this self-consciousness might interfere with or distort from how they actually behave outside of a research context (where they would not feel they were being scrutinized). For example, if a psychologist is interested in learning the conditions under which students cheat on tests, directly asking them, "how often do you cheat?," might result in a high percent of "socially desirable" answers and the researcher would, in any case, be unable to verify the accuracy of these responses. In general, then, when it is unfeasible or naive to simply ask people directly why or how often they do what they do, researchers turn to the use of deception to distract their participants from the true behavior of interest. So, for example, in a study of cheating, the participants may be told that the study has to do with how intuitive they are. During the process, they might be given the opportunity to look at (secretly, they think) another participant's [presumably highly intuitively correct] answers before handing in their own. At the conclusion of this or any research involving deception, all participants must be told of the true nature of the study and why deception was necessary (this is called debriefing). Moreover, it is customary to offer to provide a summary of the results to all participants at the conclusion of the research.

Though commonly used and allowed by the ethical guidelines of the American Psychological Association, there has been debate about whether or not the use of deception should be permitted in psychological research experiments. Those against deception object to the ethical and methodological issues involved in its use. Dresser (1981) notes that, ethically, researchers are only to use subjects in an experiment after the subject has given informed consent. However, because of its very nature, a researcher conducting a deception experiment cannot reveal its true purpose to the subject, thereby making any consent given by a subject misinformed (p. 3). Baumrind (1964), criticizing the use of deception in the Milgram (1963) obedience experiment, argues that deception experiments inappropriately take advantage of the implicit trust and obedience given by the subject when the subject volunteers to participate (p. 421).

From a practical perspective, there are also methodological objections to deception. Ortmann and Hertwig (1998) note that "deception can strongly affect the reputation of individual labs and the profession, thus contaminating the participant pool" (p. 806). If the subjects in the experiment are suspicious of the researcher, they are unlikely to behave as they normally would, and the researcher's control of the experiment is then compromised (p. 807). Those who do not object to the use of deception note that there is always a constant struggle in balancing "the need for conducting research that may solve social problems and the necessity for preserving the dignity and rights of the research participant" (Christensen, 1988, p. 670). They also note that, in some cases, using deception is the only way to obtain certain kinds of information, and that prohibiting all deception in research would "have the egregious consequence of preventing researchers from carrying out a wide range of important studies" (Kimmel, 1998, p. 805).

Additionally, findings suggest that deception is not harmful to subjects. Christensen's (1988) review of the literature found "that research participants do not perceive that they are harmed and do not seem to mind being misled" (p. 668). Furthermore, those participating in experiments involving deception "reported having enjoyed the experience more and perceived more educational benefit" than those who participated in non-deceptive experiments (p. 668). Lastly, it has also been suggested that an unpleasant treatment used in a deception study or the unpleasant implications of the outcome of a deception study may be the underlying reason that a study using deception is perceived as unethical in nature, rather than the actual deception itself (Broder, 1998, p. 806; Christensen, 1988, p. 671).

In social research
Some methodologies in social research, especially in psychology, involve deception. The researchers purposely mislead or misinform the participants about the true nature of the experiment. In an experiment conducted by Stanley Milgram in 1963 the researchers told participants that they would be participating in a scientific study of memory and learning. In reality the study looked at the participants' willingness to obey commands, even when that involved inflicting pain upon another person. After the study, the subjects were informed of the true nature of the study, and steps were taken in order to ensure that the subjects left in a state of well-being. Use of deception raises many problems of research ethics and it is strictly regulated by professional bodies such as the American Psychological Association.

In games

In the card game poker, players attempt to bluff one another about the value of the unseen cards that they hold in their hand.

In computer security

See also

References

Citations

General and cited sources 

 American Psychological Association – Ethical principles of psychologists and code of conduct. (2010). Retrieved February 7, 2013.
 Bassett, Rodney L.; Basinger, David; & Livermore, Paul. (1992, December). Lying in the Laboratory: Deception in Human Research from a Psychological, Philosophical, and Theological Perspectives. ASA3.org
 Baumrind, D. (1964). Some thoughts on ethics of research: After reading Milgram's "Behavioral Study of Obedience." American Psychologist, 19(6), 421–423. Retrieved February 21, 2008, from the PsycINFO database.
 
 Behrens, Roy R. (2009). Camoupedia: A Compendium of Research on Art, Architecture and Camouflage. Bobolink Books. .
 
 Bröder, A. (1998). Deception can be acceptable. American Psychologist, 53(7), 805–806. Retrieved February 22, 2008, from the PsycINFO database.
 
 
 Dresser, R. S. (1981). Deception research and the HHS final regulations. IRB: Ethics and Human Research, 3(4), 3–4. Retrieved February 21, 2008, from the JSTOR database.
 Edelman, Murray Constructing the political spectacle 1988
 .
 Kimmel, A. J. (1998). "In defense of deception". American Psychologist, 53(7), 803–805. Retrieved February 22, 2008, from the PsycINFO database.
 
 Milgram, S. (1963). "Behavioral study of obedience". The Journal of Abnormal and Social Psychology, 67(4), 371–378. Retrieved February 25, 2008 from the PsycARTICLES database.
 Ortmann, A. & Hertwig, R. (1998). "The question remains: Is deception acceptable?" American Psychologist, 53(7), 806–807. Retrieved February 22, 2008, from the PsycINFO database.
 Shaughnessy, J. J., Zechmeister, E. B., & Zechmeister, J. S. (2006). Research Methods in Psychology (Seventh Edition). Boston: McGraw Hill.
 Bruce Schneier, Secrets and Lies
 Robert Wright, The Moral Animal: Why We Are the Way We Are: The New Science of Evolutionary Psychology. Vintage, 1995. .

Further reading 
 Robert, W.; Thompson, Nicholas S., eds., Deception. Perspectives on Human and Nonhuman Deceit. New York: State University of New York Press.
 Kopp, Carlo, Deception in Biology: Nature's Exploitation of Information to Win Survival Contests. Monash University, October 2011.
 "Scientists Pick Out Human Lie Detectors", NBC News/Associated Press
 Zhang Yingyu, The Book of Swindles: Selections from a Late Ming Collection, translated by Christopher Rea and Bruce Rusk (New York: Columbia University Press, 2017).

External links 
 
 
 

 
Barriers to critical thinking
Communication
Human behavior
Psychology experiments